Swing When You're Winning is a swing cover album by English singer-songwriter Robbie Williams, and his fourth studio album overall. It was released in the United Kingdom on 19 November 2001 and peaked at number one on the UK Albums Chart.

The album's title is a play on Williams' previous album Sing When You're Winning. In 2013, Williams returned to swing for his tenth studio album Swings Both Ways. Unlike Swing When You're Winning, however, the sequel is nearly evenly divided between covers and original songs penned by Williams and Guy Chambers.

Background
After the success of his third studio album, Sing When You're Winning, Williams wanted to take another musical direction. He took two weeks off his tour to record what would be his fourth studio album, an album he described as the "big band album he had always dreamed of making." The album was released in November 2001. Consisting mainly of swing covers common to the Great American Songbook, the album counts as Williams' fourth studio album. Aside from the title, the album is not directly associated with Williams' previous album, Sing When You're Winning. Born from his lifelong love for Frank Sinatra, combined with the success of the track "Have You Met Miss Jones?" that he recorded for the film Bridget Jones's Diary in early 2001, the album was recorded at the Capitol Studios in Los Angeles, and was symbolically released under the Capitol label.

The album features duets with actors Rupert Everett, Nicole Kidman, Jon Lovitz and Jane Horrocks, as well as a special guest performance from Williams' friend and former flatmate Jonathan Wilkes. Surprisingly the album features a duet with Frank Sinatra who died in 1998, on the song "It Was a Very Good Year", in which the instrumental backing track is sampled from the original Sinatra recording, the first two verses are sung by Williams, and, for the third and fourth verses, Sinatra's original vocal track is used. Williams explains this came about after one of his session musicians played his vocals to Sinatra's family. This musician was purportedly a good friend of the family, and played with Sinatra on the original release of "It Was a Very Good Year". Another surprising guest musician is pianist Bill Miller, who accompanies Williams on "One for My Baby". Miller played on many of Sinatra's tours and recordings, among them, the original 1954 soundtrack recording of "One for My Baby" and the 1958 Capitol studio recording. Additionally, backing musicians for portions of the album include the London Session Orchestra. The album's lead song, "I Will Talk and Hollywood Will Listen", is the only original song on the album. Additionally, Williams' recording of "Beyond the Sea" was featured in the 2003 animated motion picture Finding Nemo.

Critical reception

In a retrospective review John Bush of AllMusic rated the album four out of five stars, saying the album is "a surprisingly natural fit with its intended target: '50s trad-pop patriarchs like Frank Sinatra and Dean Martin. And just like those two loveable rogues, Williams has brawled and boozed in the past, but isn't afraid to wear his heart on his sleeve; in fact, he's one of the few modern pop stars to fully embrace affecting balladry and nuanced singing." American publication Slant Magazine also rated the album four out of five stars, saying the album is "doused with cheeky humor" and that "Britain's bad boy proves that not only can he artfully capture our attention, he's actually worthy of it." NME were more mixed in their opinion, rating the album 5/10 and saying the album "mistakes celebrity for entertainment, cabaret for class."

Commercial performance
The album spent 57 weeks on the UK Albums Chart, certified 7× Platinum, and became the 49th best-selling album of all-time in the UK. In Germany, the album has become Williams' best-selling album there, selling more than 1,500,000 copies being certified 5× Platinum. The album debuted at No. 1 and stayed there for nine non-consecutive weeks. It managed to stay 83 weeks on the German Albums Chart, nineteen weeks of those in the top 10. Thanks to its success, it became the fourth best-selling album of the decade in Germany. In 2001 the album was the 17th best-selling album globally, selling 4.4 million copies.

Legacy
Entertainment.ie credits the album for starting a "craze" for big band tribute-style albums. Pop Idol: The Big Band Album (2002), an album of big band songs sung by the contestants of series 1 of Pop Idol, was one such similar album inspired by Swing When You're Winning. Zoe Birkett, one of the contestants who performs on the album, said "we've all listened to [Swing When You're Winning] and it's really brilliant music."

Singles
"Somethin' Stupid", a duet with Nicole Kidman, was released as the album's first single. A cover of Frank and Nancy Sinatra, the song became Williams' fifth number 1 in the United Kingdom, selling almost 100,000 copies in the week of release, as well as hitting the top spot in Argentina, New Zealand, Latvia and scoring top ten placings all over Europe. It became one of the biggest hits of 2001, selling over 200,000 copies in the UK alone after spending three weeks at the top of the charts, being certified Silver in January 2002.

A double A-side of "Mr. Bojangles" and "I Will Talk and Hollywood Will Listen" was released as the album's second and final single; however, it was only released in Central and Eastern Europe.

Live performances

A live performance of the album from The Royal Albert Hall was released on DVD in December 2001. It has become one of the best selling music DVDs of all time in Europe, being certified 6× Platinum in the United Kingdom alone and 2× Platinum in Germany. The performance includes renditions of nearly all of the songs from the album, with guest appearances from Jonathan Wilkes, Jon Lovitz, and Jane Horrocks, as well as a live version of Robbie's 'duet' with Frank Sinatra. Rupert Everett emceed, and Nicole Kidman attended the show, but neither performed their duets featured on the album. Thus, "They Can't Take That Away from Me" and "Somethin' Stupid" were the only songs from the album which were not performed live. Additionally, there were three songs performed live which did not appear on the album: "The Lady Is a Tramp", which featured as a B-side to "Mr. Bojangles", and "Let's Face the Music and Dance" and "My Way", which features as B-sides to "Somethin' Stupid".

On the occasion of the European premiere of the Disney movie Finding Nemo in November 2003 in Berlin, Williams, accompanied by a youth orchestra, gave a live performance of several songs of the album in the subway station "Bundestag" (which at that time was only structurally completed) in front of a few hundred invited premiere guests.

Williams gave a rare performance of "Mack the Knife" at Elizabeth II's Diamond Jubilee Concert in June 2012, and he performed four songs from this album on his first Swing tour in 2014, in promotion of his second swing album Swings Both Ways.

Track listing
All tracks produced by Guy Chambers; except "Somethin' Stupid" and "Things" produced by Chambers and Steve Power.

Notes
"It Was a Very Good Year": Original recording produced by Sonny Burke.
"They Can't Take That Away from Me": Rupert Everett's vocals produced by Nicky Holland.

Personnel
 Robbie Williams – vocals
 Chuck Berghofer – bass guitar
 Bruce Otto – trombone
 Wayne Bergeron – trumpet
 Ralph Salmins – drums
 Jim Cox – piano
 Craig Ware – trombone
 Gary Foster – alto saxophone
 Harold Jones – drums
 Andy Macintosh – alto saxophone
 Alex Illes – trombone
 Beverley Dahlke-Smith – baritone saxophone
 Chuck Findley – trumpet
 George Doering – guitar
 Phil Todd – baritone saxophone
 Sam Burgess – double bass
 Sal Lozano – tenor saxophone
 Bill Miller – piano
 Frank Ricotti – percussion
 Dave Stewart – trombone
 Stuart Brooks – trumpet
 Eric Marienthal – alto saxophone
 Gordon Campbell – trombone
 John Barclay – trumpet
 Dan Higgins – alto saxophone
 Dave Bishop – tenor saxophone
 Greg Huckins – baritone saxophone
 Andy Martin – trombone
 Brian Kilgore – percussion
 Phil Teele – trombone
 Dave Catlin-Birch – bass guitar
 Chris White – tenor saxophone
 Jamie Talbot – saxophone
 Jeff Bunnell – trumpet
 Bill Liston – alto saxophone
 Mitch Dalton – electric guitar
 Paul Spong – trumpet
 Anthony Kerr – vibraphone
 Steve Sidwell – trumpet
 Brian Kilgore – percussion
 Steven Holtman – trombone
 Dave Arch – piano
 Dennis Farias – trumpet

Charts

Weekly charts

Year-end charts

Decade-end charts

Certifications and sales

See also
List of best-selling albums in Germany

References

2001 albums
Robbie Williams albums
Frank Sinatra tribute albums
Capitol Records albums
Covers albums
Swing albums
Albums recorded at Capitol Studios
Albums recorded at Electric Lady Studios